Afaha Urua Essien is a village in Etinan the local governmental area of Akwa Ibom State in Nigeria.

References 

Villages in Akwa Ibom